Zari Mahalleh (also Romanized as Zārī Maḩalleh; also known as Zāre‘ Maḩalleh) is a village in Miandorud-e Bozorg Rural District, in the Central District of Miandorud County, Mazandaran Province, Iran. At the 2006 census, its population was 21, in 7 families.

References 

Populated places in Miandorud County